James Emmet Carr (January 28, 1955 – August 15, 2013) was an American  wrestler, born in Erie, Pennsylvania, who competed in the 1972 Summer Olympics

Carr died August 15, 2013 from complications from a motor vehicle crash.

References

1955 births
2013 deaths
Sportspeople from Erie, Pennsylvania
Olympic wrestlers of the United States
Wrestlers at the 1972 Summer Olympics
American male sport wrestlers